The Bath Festival of Blues was a music festival held at the Bath Pavilion Recreational Ground in Bath, Somerset, England, on Saturday 28 June 1969. It featured a lineup of British blues bands, including Fleetwood Mac (the headliners), John Mayall's Bluesbreakers, Ten Years After, Led Zeppelin, The Nice, Chicken Shack, Jon Hiseman's Colosseum, Mick Abrahams' Blodwyn Pig and Principal Edwards Magic Theatre amongst others.

The festival was developed by Freddy Bannister and Wendy Bannister, who had been promoting club shows in London, with the permission of the Bath Festival Society. The festival was organised very simply with tables at the gates and screens to prevent people getting in for free, all the bands used the Pavilion as a back stage area. However, despite the very limited security the fans did not present a hazard and were generally well behaved.

The festival proved very popular, selling out all 30,000 tickets in the first week, surprising both the townsfolk and the promoters. The only major problem occurred when The Nice's use of bagpipers caused the stage to collapse and had to be repaired. The festival was well received and both the promoters and the Bath Chamber of Commerce were keen to put on another festival the next year, becoming the Bath Festival of Blues and Progressive Music and reinviting both many of the same acts back and other bigger names, especially from the United States.

Further reading
Bath Festival, June 1969 & June 1970; Mike Watt; in, Classic rock; Issue 109; August 2007; Future Publications; pp. 46–47.

See also

List of blues festivals
List of historic rock festivals
List of music festivals in the United Kingdom

References

Music festivals established in 1969
Festivals in Bath, Somerset
History of Bath, Somerset
Music festivals in Somerset
Rock festivals in England
Counterculture festivals
1969 in British music
1969 in England
Blues festivals in the United Kingdom
Folk festivals in the United Kingdom
20th century in Somerset
1969 music festivals
June 1969 events in the United Kingdom